The 2016–17 Minnesota Golden Gophers women's basketball team represented the University of Minnesota during the 2016–17 NCAA Division I women's basketball season. The Golden Gophers, led by third year head coach Marlene Stollings, played their home games at Williams Arena and were members of the Big Ten Conference. They finished the season 15–16, 5–11 in Big Ten play to finish in tenth place. They advanced to the quarterfinals of the Big Ten women's tournament where they lost to Maryland.

Roster

Schedule and results

|-
! colspan="9" style="text-align: center; background:#800000"|Non conference regular season

|-
! colspan="9" style="text-align: center; background:#800000"|Big Ten regular season

|-
! colspan="9" style="text-align: center; background:#800000"|Big Ten Women's Tournament

Source

Rankings

See also
 2016–17 Minnesota Golden Gophers men's basketball team

References

Minnesota Golden Gophers women's basketball seasons
Minnesota
Minnesota Golden
Minnesota Golden